Godoberi is a rural locality (a selo) and the administrative centre of Godoberinsky Selsoviet, Botlikhsky District, Republic of Dagestan, Russia. The population was 3,049 as of 2010. There are 30 streets.

Geography 
Godoberi is located 16 km southwest of Botlikh (the district's administrative centre) by road. Miarso is the nearest rural locality.

References 

Rural localities in Botlikhsky District